William Caleb "Cale" Yarborough (born March 27, 1939) is an American former NASCAR Winston Cup Series driver and owner, businessman, and farmer. He is one of only two drivers in NASCAR history to win three consecutive championships, winning in 1976, 1977, and 1978. He was one of the preeminent stock car drivers from the 1960s to the 1980s and also competed in IndyCar events. His fame was such that a special model of the Mercury Cyclone Spoiler II was named after him.

His 83 wins tie him with Jimmie Johnson for sixth on the all-time NASCAR Cup Series winner's list (behind Bobby Allison and Darrell Waltrip, who are tied for fourth with 84). His 14.82% winning percentage is the ninth best of all-time and third among those with 500 or more starts. Yarborough won the Daytona 500 four times; his first win coming in 1968 for the Wood Brothers, the second in 1977 for Junior Johnson, and back-to-back wins in 1983 and 1984 for Ranier-Lundy Racing. Yarborough is a three-time winner of the National Motorsports Press Association Driver of the Year Award (1977, 1978, 1979). After retiring, he owned Cale Yarborough Motorsports and several successful agricultural businesses.

Beginnings
Yarborough was born to Julian and Annie Yarborough in the tiny, unincorporated community of Sardis near Timmonsville, South Carolina, the oldest of three sons. Julian was a tobacco farmer, cotton gin operator, and store owner who was killed in a private airplane crash when Cale was around ten years of age. According to his autobiography Cale, Yarborough attended the second Southern 500 in 1951 as a young spectator without a ticket. Yarborough was a high school football star at Timmonsville High School and played semi-pro football in Columbia, South Carolina for four seasons and was a Golden Gloves boxer. He made his first attempt in the Southern 500 as a teenager by lying about his age, but he was caught and disqualified by NASCAR. In 1957, Yarborough made his debut as a driver at the Southern 500, driving the No. 30 Pontiac for Bob Weatherly, starting 44th and finishing 42nd after suffering hub problems. He ran for Weatherly two years later, and finished 27th. In 1960, Yarborough ran one race, and had his first career top-fifteen, a fourteenth-place finish at Southern States Fairgrounds. He again ran one race in 1961, finishing 30th in the Southern 500 driving for Julian Buesink. In 1962, Yarborough ran eight races for Buesink, Don Harrison, and Wildcat Williams. He earned his first top-ten at the Daytona 500 Qualifying Race, when he finished tenth.

1960s
Yarborough started 1963 without a full-time ride, but soon signed on to drive the No. 19 Ford for Herman Beam. His best finish was fifth twice, at Myrtle Beach and Savannah Speedway, respectively. He began the next season driving for Beam, but left and finished the year with Holman Moody, finishing sixth at North Wilkesboro Speedway, winding up 19th in points. The next season, he drove for various owners before picking up his first career win at Valdosta Speedway driving the #06 Ford for Kenny Myler, rising to 10th in the final standings.

Yarborough drove for Banjo Matthews at the beginning of 1966. Despite two consecutive second-place finishes, he left the team early in the season and ended the year driving the No. 21 Ford for the Wood Brothers. He won two races in 1967 at the Atlanta 500 and the Firecracker 400 for the Wood Brothers, but dropped to 20th in standings because he only ran 17 races. Yarborough also ran the Indianapolis 500 in 1966 and 1967 driving Vollstedt-Fords. After running the season-opening Middle Georgia 500 for Bud Moore Engineering, finishing 21st, Yarborough ran the rest of the season for the Wood Brothers, winning his first Daytona 500 in a duel with LeeRoy Yarbrough, the Firecracker 400, which made him the second driver in history to sweep both Daytona events, and his first Southern 500 garnering a total of six wins that season. Running a limited schedule, he finished 17th in points. The next season, he won his third straight Atlanta 500 along with the first NASCAR race at Michigan International Speedway the Motor State 500 and six pole positions.

In 1969, the Ford Motor Company produced a Cale Yarborough Special Edition Mercury Cyclone Spoiler II (and they also produced a Mercury Cyclone Spoiler).  It was a white Mercury Cyclone (fastback) in white with a red roof and stripe.  The Spoiler II was outfitted with a special aerodynamic front end.  This was a limited edition homologation special that was made to satisfy the NASCAR 500-car minimum production regulations. There was only one engine choice available in the Mercury Cyclone Spoiler II, a 351 cubic inch Windsor; a very similar car was also produced by Mercury in 1969 as a white car with blue trim as the Dan Gurney Special.

1970s
Yarborough continued to drive a limited schedule for the Wood Brothers in 1970, winning his second consecutive Michigan 400 and the American 500 for the first time along with one of the Daytona 125-mile qualifying races and four poles. At the end of the season, Yarborough was released after Ford withdrew factory support for NASCAR teams. He drove four races in 1971, posting one top-ten in Daytona in the No. 3 Ray Fox-owned Plymouth. He also ran in the Indianapolis 500, finishing 16th in a Gene White-owned, Firestone-sponsored Mongoose-Ford. The next season, Yarborough ran five NASCAR races, his best finish coming at Michigan driving for James Hylton. He ended the season with two consecutive Top 10's driving for Hoss Ellington. He also ran his final Indianapolis 500 in a Bill Daniels sponsored Atlanta-Foyt, finishing 10th. Yarborough mostly focused on driving USAC races in 1971 and 1972. In 1973, Yarborough returned to NASCAR and ran every NASCAR Grand National race in a season for the first time in his career, driving the No. 11 Kar-Kare Chevrolet for Richard Howard. He won four races, including his second Southern 500, the National 500 and the Southeastern 500 at Bristol in which he led every lap, and had 19 Top 10's, finishing second in points.

In 1974, Yarborough won a career-high ten races, but lost the championship by nearly 600 points. Midway through the season, Yarborough's team was bought by Junior Johnson with Carling sponsorship. Yarborough swept both races at Riverside International Raceway, captured his fourth Atlanta 500, and his second consecutive Southern 500 and third overall. Despite his successful 1974 campaign, the team began 1975 without major sponsorship, and missed three races, before Holly Farms became the team's primary sponsor. He won three races, including sweeping the events at Rockingham, but dropped to ninth in the final standings.

The next 3 years would be Cale Yarborough's time to shine. In 1976, he won nine races, including four in a row late in the season, along with winning the Firecracker 400, in winning his first career Winston Cup Championship. The 1977 season would be the greatest year in Cale Yarborough's legendary career. Not only that he would go on to repeat his nine-win performance from 1976, but he finished every single race, and did not finish outside of the Top 6 during the last 14 races of the season. In just a 30-race schedule for 1977, he scored a total of 5000 points under the Winston Cup points system, earning him his second consecutive championship. He won the title by 386 points over Richard Petty.  Yarborough became the first driver in NASCAR history to win the championship and NOT score a single DNF. Bobby Labonte would join Cale and become only the second driver to do the same thing in 2000. As of 2022, they are the only two drivers in history to do so. Yarborough led the Winston Cup points standings throughout the entire 1977 season, making him the only driver in NASCAR history to accomplish that feat. However, there was a tie in points after the very first race of the season. David Pearson went on to win the race at Riverside. Yarborough finished second, and he received the bonus points for leading the most laps. Both drivers were scored at 180 points each after Riverside. Technically, back in the Winston Cup points system, the tiebreaker would go to the driver who has the most wins. NASCAR listed Pearson as the points leader because he scored the season's first win, but, he was also racing on a part-time schedule. They also listed Yarborough as the points leader because he was racing full-time and competing for the season's championship, and more importantly, defending his championship from 1976. The 1977 season became the only year in NASCAR history to list two drivers as the points leader. Another highlight of the season was his second Daytona 500 victory, earning him a cover appearance on Sports Illustrated, the second NASCAR driver so honored. He also scored two victories in IROC IV, finishing second in the standings. In 1978, his team switched to Oldsmobiles and received new sponsorship from First National City Travelers Checks. He matched his previous career high of 10 wins from 1974, including leading every lap of the Music City USA 420, his fourth Southern 500 and first Winston 500 at Talladega, and went on to win his third consecutive NASCAR Winston Cup championship (clinching it at the American 500). Cale Yarborough became the very first driver in NASCAR history to win three consecutive championships. He clinched the 1978 championship with two races to go, becoming the second driver to win the title that early in the Winston Cup points system. Richard Petty clinched the 1975 championship with four races to go. In IROC V he captured one victory, finishing fourth in the standings.

Yarborough began the 1979 season with Busch Beer sponsorship and getting into a fight with Donnie and Bobby Allison after the Daytona 500, when Donnie and Yarborough wrecked while racing for the lead on the final lap. This was the first NASCAR 500-mile race to be broadcast on live television in its entirety (through CBS Sports). The confrontation and the exciting race that led up to it are credited with starting the mass growth of NASCAR.
Yarborough went on to finish fourth in the standings, winning four races, including the Coca-Cola 500 at Pocono Raceway and the National 500 at Charlotte Motor Speedway, one pole, and finishing third in the IROC VI standings.

1980s
Yarborough won a career-high and modern-era record 14 poles in 1980, captured six races including sweeping the events at Rockingham, and scoring wins at Bristol, Michigan, Texas and Atlanta. Yarborough barely missed out on his fourth championship in five years, losing the championship to Dale Earnhardt by 19 points. At the end of the season, Yarborough announced he was leaving the Junior Johnson team and would run a part-time schedule for the rest of his career. He was replaced by Darrell Waltrip. Yarborough won 55 races while driving for Johnson from 1973 to 1980, compiling an amazing winning percentage of 26.57 percent.

Yarborough competed in 18 races in the 1981 season in the No. 27 Valvoline-sponsored Buick for M.C. Anderson, winning his fourth Firecracker 400 and his fifth Coca-Cola 500 at Atlanta, finishing in the Top 10 a total of 10 times. Yarborough competed in 16 races in 1982, winning three, including his hometown Southern 500 for the fifth and final time.  He also ran the 1981 24 Hours of Le Mans finishing 13 laps before a crash ended the team's efforts.

In 1983, Anderson closed his operation, and Yarborough moved to the No. 28 Hardee's-sponsored Chevrolet owned by Ranier-Lundy, competing in 16 events. He won four races, including his third Daytona 500, his sixth Atlanta Coca-Cola 500, and swept both events at Michigan, along with three poles. In 1984, he repeated by winning his fourth Daytona 500, becoming the second driver to score back-to-back wins, the Winston 500 at Talladega, a race that featured 75 lead changes, and the Van Scoy Diamond Mine 500, along with four poles. Yarborough also captured the IROC VIII championship. In 1985, after his team switched to a Ford, he won his first Talladega 500 and scored his final win in the Miller High Life 500 at Charlotte Motor Speedway. He also finished eighth in the final standings of IROC IX.

In 1986, Yarborough won his final career pole at the Firecracker 400, and had five Top 10 finishes. He scored a victory at Talladega during IROC X and finished third in the standings. In 1987, he left the Ranier-Lundy team and purchased Jack Beebe's Race Hill Farm team. Yarborough took the Hardee's sponsorship and began running the No. 29 Oldsmobile Delta 88 as an owner/driver, posting two Top 5 finishes. He ran his final season in 1988 in an Oldsmobile Cutlass Supreme, entering 10 races and posting two ninth-place finishes. He retired at the end of the year.

Politics
In 1972, Yarborough became the first Republican elected to the Florence  County Council since Reconstruction. During the 1976 United States presidential election, he campaigned for his longtime friend, Jimmy Carter. That year, Yarborough was reelected to the county council, this time as a Democrat.

Ownership

In 1986 Yarborough purchased Jack Beebe's Race Hill Farm team, renaming the team Cale Yarborough Motorsports and running a part-time schedule in 1987 and 1988. During the 1988 season, Yarborough split time in the No. 29 car with Dale Jarrett, who took over full-time in 1989 following Yarborough's retirement.

For 1990, Jarrett was replaced by Dick Trickle in the renumbered No. 66 car, with backing from Phillips 66. The team won the pole at Dover International Speedway, finishing 24th in points. Multiple drivers raced for Yarborough in 1991, including Trickle, Lake Speed, Dorsey Schroeder, Chuck Bown, and Randy LaJoie. Chad Little, Bobby Hillin, Jr, and Jimmy Hensley would all drive the No. 66 in 1992, with Hensley winning Rookie of the Year honors. 

In 1993, the team switched to the No. 98 with Bojangles' sponsorship and Derrike Cope behind the wheel, finishing 26th in points. Cope began 1994 with sponsorship from Fingerhut, but was replaced by Jeremy Mayfield after struggling.

RCA became the team's new primary sponsor in 1995, and Mayfield finished 31st in points despite missing four races. In 1996, Mayfield had two top-five finishes and won the pole at Talladega Superspeedway. Towards the end of the season, Mayfield left to drive for Michael Kranefuss, whose previous driver John Andretti moved to the 98, finishing fifth at Martinsville Speedway. Andretti won the team's second pole at Talladega in 1997, and at the 1997 Pepsi 400, he led 113 laps and won Yarborough's only race as a car owner. 

Despite the win and a 23rd-place points finish, RCA left the sport and Andretti signed with Petty Enterprises. Yarborough signed Greg Sacks to drive his Thorn Apple Valley Ford in 1998, but Sacks suffered a neck injury at Texas Motor Speedway and was unable to race for the rest of the year. Rich Bickle took his place, and had a fourth-place finish at Martinsville. After the season Bickle resigned to drive for Tyler Jet Motorsports and Thorn Apple departed due to financial problems within the organization. 

Due to the lack of financing, Yarborough originally closed his team, but soon reopened and hired Rick Mast as the driver, with car dealer Wayne Burdett joining as a co-owner. Despite having no primary sponsor, Yarborough and his team ran the full schedule, picking up short-term deals with Sonic Drive-In and Hobas Pipe. Soon after, Burdette left the team and the team signed Universal Studios/Woody Woodpecker as its primary sponsor. Mast posted two top-tens and did not have a DNF all season, the second driver since Yarborough to accomplish that feat. Despite rumors of a second team with Mike Ciochetti driving, Mast and Universal both departed following the season. In January 2000, Yarborough closed the team until a buyer could be found. 

He sold the team in the summer of 2000 to Chip MacPherson. Renamed MacPherson Motorsports, the team ran 2 races with drivers  Jeff Fuller and Geoffrey Bodine. Both drivers failed to finish the race and finished 41st. Soon afterward, the team disappeared from the Cup circuit.

Motorsports career results

NASCAR
(key) (Bold – Pole position awarded by qualifying time. Italics – Pole position earned by points standings or practice time. * – Most laps led.)

Grand National Series

Winston Cup Series

Daytona 500

Winston West Series

International Race of Champions
(key) (Bold – Pole position. * – Most laps led.)

American open-wheel racing
(key) (Races in bold indicate pole position)

USAC Championship Car

Indianapolis 500

24 Hours of Le Mans results

Legacy
Yarborough was inducted into the International Motorsports Hall of Fame in 1993, the National Motorsports Press Association Hall of Fame, and the Motorsports Hall of Fame of America in 1994, the Court of Legends at Charlotte Motor Speedway in 1996 and was named one of NASCAR's 50 Greatest Drivers (1998). In 2009, Yarborough was one of the 25 nominees for the first class to be inducted in the NASCAR Hall of Fame, though he was not selected. In 2010, he was nominated for induction in the second class of the Hall of Fame, and again he failed to make the cut. In 2011, Yarborough finally was elected to the NASCAR HOF. A stretch of South Carolina Highway 403 through Timmonsville is named Cale Yarborough Highway in his honor.

In March 2013, Yarborough was inducted into the South Carolina Hall of Fame.

Personal life
In high school Yarborough was a halfback, then played four years of semi-pro football and was offered a tryout with the Washington Redskins.

Yarborough has been married to Betty Jo Thigpen since 1961 and they have three daughters (Julie, Kelley, and B.J.). He has owned Cale Yarborough Honda in Florence, South Carolina for over 25 years. He currently resides in Sardis, SC. Yarborough is not related to fellow NASCAR veteran Lee Roy Yarbrough though they were close friends all their lives.

General references 
 "Where Are They Now? Cale Yarborough", Indianapolis Motor Speedway Official Blog

Citations

Further reading
 Bechtel, Mark. He Crashed Me So I Crashed Him Back: The True Story of the Year the King, Jaws, Earnhardt, and the Rest of NASCAR's Feudin', Fightin' Good Ol' Boys Put Stock Car Racing on the Map, Little, Brown and Company, 2010, .
 Hinton, Ed. Daytona: From the Birth of Speed to the Death of the Man in Black, Warner, 2001, .
 Menzer, Joe. The Great American Gamble: How the 1979 Daytona 500 Gave Birth to a NASCAR Nation, Wiley, 2009, .
 McGinnis, Joe. They Call Him Cale: The Life and Career of NASCAR Legend Cale Yarborough, Triumph Books, 2008, .
 Yarborough, Cale, with William Neely. Cale: The Hazardous Life and Times of the World's Greatest Stock Car Driver, Times Books, 1986, .

External links
 
 
 
 
 
 

1939 births
24 Hours of Le Mans drivers
County council members in South Carolina
Farmers from South Carolina
Indianapolis 500 drivers
International Motorsports Hall of Fame inductees
International Race of Champions drivers
Living people
NASCAR Cup Series champions
NASCAR drivers
NASCAR team owners
People from Timmonsville, South Carolina
Racing drivers from South Carolina
World Sportscar Championship drivers
NASCAR Hall of Fame inductees